Castle Hill is a suburb of Townsville in the City of Townsville, Queensland, Australia. The suburb is based on and around the mountain of the same name.

The Indigenous name for Castle Hill is Cootharinga, sometimes written as Cooderinga.

Geography 
Most of the suburb is taken up with the Castle Hill reserve with only a small area in the north of the suburb being available for housing.

History 
Castle Hill is situated in the traditional Wulgurukaba Aboriginal country. The origin of the suburb name is taken from the geographical feature Castle Hill, thought to be named by an early pastoralist Andrew Ball. The Aboriginal name Cudtheringa was approved by Lieutenant George Poynter Heath, on advice from castaway James Morrill during a survey of Cleveland Bay in 1864.

In the 2011 census, Castle Hill had a population of 1,009 people. 

Heritage listings 
The Castle Hill reserve is listed on the Queensland Heritage Register.

References

External links 

Suburbs of Townsville